The enzyme citrate (pro-3S)-lyase catalyzes the chemical reaction

citrate  acetate + oxaloacetate

This enzyme belongs to the family of lyases, specifically the oxo-acid-lyases, which cleave carbon-carbon bonds.  The systematic name of this enzyme class is citrate oxaloacetate-lyase (forming acetate from the pro-S carboxymethyl group of citrate). Other names in common use include citrase, citratase, citritase, citridesmolase, citrate aldolase, citric aldolase, citrate lyase, citrate oxaloacetate-lyase, and citrate oxaloacetate-lyase [(pro-3S)-CH2COO-->acetate].  This enzyme participates in citrate cycle and two-component system - general.

Structural studies

References

 
 

EC 4.1.3
Enzymes of known structure